Captain America: Civil War (Original Motion Picture Soundtrack) is the film score to the Marvel Studios film Captain America: Civil War composed by Henry Jackman. Hollywood Records released the album on May 6, 2016.

Background
In August 2014, directors Anthony and Joe Russo announced that Jackman, who wrote the score for Captain America: The Winter Soldier, would return to write the score for Civil War. Jackman noted that the industrial elements of the track "The Winter Soldier" from the soundtrack to The Winter Soldier was a good indication of what the soundtrack to Civil War would sound like, though he cautioned it was "just a jumping off point since the Russos are looking for something new — similar with a twist."  However, Jackman noted that the score for Civil War is more symphonic and orchestral than Winter Soldier.

Track listing
All music composed by Henry Jackman.

Additional music
One additional song, "Left Hand Free" by alt-J, is featured in the movie, but was not included on the soundtrack album. It is played when Peter Parker / Spider-Man is first introduced in the film, and during the end credit sequence.

Charts

References

2016 soundtrack albums
2010s film soundtrack albums
Marvel Cinematic Universe: Phase Three soundtracks
Captain America (film series)
Henry Jackman soundtracks